Pollastrini is an Italian surname. Notable people with the surname include:

Barbara Pollastrini (born 1947), Italian politician and university professor
Elettra Pollastrini (1908–1990), Italian politician
Enrico Pollastrini (1817–1876), Italian painter

Italian-language surnames